Cole Building or Cole Block or variations may refer to:

in Scotland
Jack Cole Building, University of St. Andrews, St. Andrews, named for Jack Cole (scientist)

in the United States 
(by state then city)
Cole Block (San Diego, California), a historic landmark building of San Diego
Cole Block (Bethel, Maine), building listed on the National Register of Historic Places (NRHP) in Oxford County
Cole Field House, also known as William P. Cole Student Activities Building, University of Maryland
Eustace–Cole Hall, Michigan State University, East Lansing, Michigan
Cole County Historical Society Building, Jefferson City, Missouri, listed on the NRHP in Cole County
A.L. Cole Memorial Building, Pequot Lakes, Minnesota, listed on the NRHP in Crow Wing County
Herring-Cole Hall, St. Lawrence University, Canton, New York, NRHP-listed
Cole Hotel, Fargo, North Dakota, listed on the NRHP in Cass County
Knerr Block, Floyd Block, McHench Building and Webster and Cole Building, Fargo, North Dakota, listed on the NRHP in Cass County
Anna Russell Cole Auditorium, Nashville, Tennessee, listed on the NRHP in Davidson County
Cole Watch Tower, Omro, Wisconsin, listed on the NRHP in Winnebago County

See also
Cole House (disambiguation)